Sun Dan may refer to:
 
 Sun Guangyuan (1900–1979), Chinese mathematician
 Sun Dan (gymnast) (born 1986), Chinese rhythmic gymnast
 Sun Dan (swimmer) (born 1985), Chinese former swimmer